The Nanping–Longyan railway is a railway line in China.

History
The railway opened on 29 December 2018.

Specification
It has nine stations:
Yanping (interchange with the Hefei–Fuzhou high-speed railway)
Yanping West (interchange with the Nanping–Fuzhou railway)
Sanming North (interchange with the Yingtan–Xiamen railway and Xiangtang–Putian railway)
Sanming
Yong'an South (interchange with the Yingtan–Xiamen railway)
Shuangyang
Zhangping West
Yanshi South
Longyan (interchange with the Zhangping–Longchuan railway, Ganzhou–Longyan railway, and Longyan–Xiamen railway)

References

Railway lines in China
Railway lines opened in 2018